West Virginia Route 101 is an unsigned  long north–south state highway in the City of Huntington in Cabell County, West Virginia. The southern terminus of the route is at U.S. Route 60 (31st Street). The northern terminus is at US 60 (Third Avenue).

From 31st Street, WV 101 follows Eighth Avenue west to 29th Street, where WV 101 turns north to follow 29th Street to Third Avenue.

History
WV 101 was part of US 60 until US 60 was moved two blocks to the east in 1990.

Major intersections

References

101
Transportation in Cabell County, West Virginia
Huntington, West Virginia